Graeme Stuart Murty (born 13 November 1974) is an English-born Scottish professional football coach and former player. He made 437 appearances in the Football League and Premier League, playing for York City, Reading, Charlton Athletic and Southampton. Though born in Saltburn, North Yorkshire, England, Murty qualified for Scotland through his family who were Scottish, and won four full caps. Murty joined Rangers as a development squad coach in 2016. He was twice placed in caretaker charge of the Rangers first team during 2017, and was subsequently full-time manager from December 2017 to April 2018.

Playing career

Club

York City
Murty was born in Saltburn, North Yorkshire and attended Nunthorpe School. He joined Middlesbrough's Centre of Excellence after being scouted playing for Marton Juniors, but was released aged 15. Following trials with Aston Villa, Leeds United and Stockport County, Murty joined York City's youth system on a youth training scheme in June 1991. He signed a professional contract on 2 March 1993 and was placed into the first team in the 1993–94 season.

On 20 September 1995, he played in their 3–0 victory against Manchester United in the League Cup at Old Trafford. He scored in York's League Cup victory against Everton.

Reading
Murty joined Reading on a four-year contract on 6 July 1998 for a £700,000 fee, which at the time was the highest fee paid by Reading and the highest fee received by York. His first few seasons were hampered by injury. However, once clear of injury, he quickly became an integral part of the team, and when Phil Parkinson left the club to become manager of Colchester United, Murty was appointed club captain. On 30 April 2006, Murty scored only his second goal, from a penalty, in 280 league and cup appearances when Reading played Queens Park Rangers on the final day of the 2005–06 season. It ensured that Reading reached 106 points, a record for the second tier of English football. His only previous goal for Reading came against Bristol City in March 2001.

On 1 December 2006, Murty signed a new contract to keep him at Reading until the summer of 2008, which meant he would complete 10 years at the club. On 31 March 2008, it was announced that, despite a previous announcement to the contrary, Murty had been awarded a testimonial in recognition of his services to the club, with a proportion of the proceeds going to the Swings and Smiles charity, of which he is a patron. The testimonial match was held on 21 July 2009 at Reading's Madejski Stadium and featured the current Reading team taking on members of the Reading Championship winning team of 2005–06.

In a vote to compile the Royals' best-ever eleven, Murty was voted the best right-back with 56.4% of the vote. Murty also won the BBC South Sports Personality of the Year award, at a ceremony in Southampton on 3 December 2006 where John Madejski and Steve Coppell were also honoured.

He joined Charlton Athletic on a one-month loan on 6 January 2009 to allow him to improve his match fitness. He made his debut in a 2–0 home defeat to Nottingham Forest on 10 January 2009. His loan at Charlton was extended for a second month on 2 February 2009. He returned to Reading on 2 March 2009 after suffering from a calf injury. On 15 May 2009, Murty was released by Reading.

Southampton
On 3 July 2009, Murty joined League One side Southampton on a two-week trial with a view to a permanent deal. He signed a one-year contract with Southampton 5 August 2009 after impressing. On 15 May 2010, after an injury plagued season, he was released by Southampton. In February 2012, he announced his retirement from playing.

International 
Although Murty was born in England, he qualified to play for Scotland through his father Eddie, and for the Republic of Ireland through his grandfather. He was capped four times by Scotland, with his first coming as a half-time substitute for Gary Naysmith in a 4–0 defeat away against Wales on 18 February 2004. He was in the Scotland team for the 2006 Kirin Cup in Japan, and earned his second cap after starting their 5–1 win against Bulgaria on 11 May 2006. He started Scotland's second and final match of the tournament against Japan, a 0–0 draw on 13 May 2006 that secured the Kirin Cup for Scotland.

His fourth and final cap came after starting Scotland's UEFA Euro 2008 qualifying match away to Georgia on 17 October 2007, which Scotland lost 2–0. On 30 January 2008, Murty was one of nine defenders called up by new Scotland manager George Burley for his first get-together, a training camp between 3 and 5 February 2008 at Loch Lomond.

Coaching career
He moved onto coaching after retiring from playing, and was appointed as an assistant youth development coach at Southampton's Academy on 27 February 2012, working primarily with the under-12 to under-16 teams. On 14 July 2014, Murty joined Championship club Norwich City as youth development phase lead coach, taking control of the under-16 team. He was promoted to the position of manager of the under-18 team on 8 July 2015.

Rangers
On 17 August 2016, Murty was appointed as head coach for the development squad at Scottish Premiership club Rangers. The under-20 team reached Scottish Youth Cup final in 2017, but lost to Celtic.

After Mark Warburton and David Weir left Rangers on 10 February 2017, Murty was placed in caretaker control of the Rangers first team. Murty's last match in charge was a 1–1 draw in an Old Firm derby on 12 March, a day before Pedro Caixinha took formal control of the first team. Murty reverted to his previous role with the development squad. After Caixinha was sacked in October 2017, Murty was again placed in caretaker control of the first team. On 22 December, he was appointed manager of the club until the end of the 2017–18 season. After two heavy defeats against Celtic in April 2018, namely 4–0 in the 2017–18 Scottish Cup semi-final and 5–0 in the league, Murty was removed from his role by Rangers on 1 May 2018.

Murty returned to his previous role with the under-20s in June. The reserves won the inaugural SPFL Reserve League on goal difference and the under-20s reached the Glasgow Cup final in 2018–19. Murty left Rangers in November 2021.

Personal life
Murty married Karen in June 2005, and the couple have a daughter called Freya. When at Reading he co-hosted the Andrew Peach Show on BBC Radio Berkshire every Monday morning.

Alongside presenter James Richardson, and fellow former player Leroy Rosenior, Murty appeared on the late night, local BBC South, BBC South West and BBC West football show, Late Kick Off. For 2011, alongside AFC Bournemouth's Steve Fletcher, Murty co-anchored a slot within the show called The Knowledge.

Career statistics

Club

International

Managerial statistics

	

 appointed permanent manager after initial second caretaker spell on 22 December 2017.

Honours

As a player

Club
Reading
Football League Championship: 2005–06

Scotland
Kirin Cup: 2006

Individual
PFA Team of the Year (Football League Second Division): 2001–02
Reading Player of the Season: 2001–02

References

External links

1974 births
Living people
People from Saltburn-by-the-Sea
Footballers from North Yorkshire
English footballers
Scottish footballers
Scotland B international footballers
Scotland international footballers
Association football defenders
Middlesbrough F.C. players
York City F.C. players
Reading F.C. players
Charlton Athletic F.C. players
Southampton F.C. players
English Football League players
Premier League players
English football managers
Scottish football managers
Rangers F.C. managers
Scottish Professional Football League managers
Southampton F.C. non-playing staff
Norwich City F.C. non-playing staff
Rangers F.C. non-playing staff
Sunderland A.F.C. non-playing staff 
English people of Irish descent
English people of Scottish descent
Association football coaches